Cowlersley is a district  west of Huddersfield, West Yorkshire, England. It is situated between Milnsbridge and Linthwaite and south of the A62 and the River Colne. The name Cowlersley means 'a charcoal burner's wood' and was first recorded in 1226.

The district has a primary school which was inspected by Ofsted in 2013 and listed as "requiring improvement".

Its main claim to fame is that the former British prime minister Harold Wilson was born and lived in Cowlersley in his early childhood, at 4 Warneford Road.

See also
Listed buildings in Colne Valley (eastern area)
Listed buildings in Golcar

References

Areas of Huddersfield
Colne Valley